Eddie Razaz (in Persian ادى رزاز) (full name Ardalan Razaz Rahmati, in Persian اردلان رزاز رحمتى) born on 21 December 1988 in Stockholm, Sweden) is an Iranian-Swedish singer. He was a former participant of Swedish Idol 2009 and finished sixth. Eddie Razaz and Rabih Jaber, yet another Idol participant, became a duo pop boy band as REbound! in 2010 with a number of hits on the Swedish charts. After split-up of the band in April 2011, Eddie Razaz is continuing as a solo singer. In November 2012 he was signed to Warner Music Sweden. He has done also modelling and was featured in advertisements.

Beginnings
Born in Stockholm to Iranian parents who came from Iran, he first auditioned for Swedish Idol in 2005 but was eliminated during the qualifying rounds. He also worked with a modeling agency.

Idol 2009
In 2009, he took part in TV4 Idol 2009, the sixth season of the Swedish version of Idol. This was his second, more successful, shot at the competition after not qualifying in 2005. In the 2009 edition of Idol, he reached Week 6 of the live shows before being eliminated and coming sixth overall.

He sang the following songs during the 2009 series:
Audition: "Lonely No More" by Rob Thomas
Qualifying semi-final: "Man in the Mirror" by Michael Jackson
Qualifying final: "Hurtful" by Erik Hassle
Week 1 (Club Idol): "Release Me" by Agnes Carlsson
Week 2 (Michael Jackson): "They Don't Care About Us" by Michael Jackson
Week 3 (Rock): "Beautiful Day" by U2
Week 4 (Las Vegas): "Can't Take My Eyes Off You" by Frankie Valli
Week 5 (International best track): "If You're Not the One" by Daniel Bedingfield
Week 6 (Topplisten hits): "Curly Sue" by Takida as solo and "If Only You" (by Danny Saucedo feat. Therese) as a duo with Reza Ningtyas Lindh
Eliminated finishing 6th overall

In band REbound!

After the end of the Idol, Eddie Razaz paired with Rabih Jaber, a Swedish singer of Lebanese origin and another contestant on sixth season of the Swedish Idol to form Rebound! (often stylized as REbound! with Capital R standing for Rabih and capital E for Eddie) and ended up having a few hits, most notably the chart topping "Hurricane" that reached No. 1 of Sverigetopplistan, the official Swedish Singles chart on 7 May 2010. The band had follow up singles "Not Helpless" and "Psycho" before splitting up in April 2011.

Solo music career
Razaz was reportedly preparing his debut solo album for release in 2012 and cooperating in this regard with Swedish rapper and songwriter Rebstar of Kurdish-Persian origin. No such album materialized.

Melodifestivalen
Eddie Razaz took part in Melodifestivalen 2013 with the song "Alibi" written by Peter Boström and Thomas G:son in a bid to represent Sweden during Eurovision Song Contest 2013 to be held in Malmö, Sweden. He performed in the third semi-final held in Skellefteå Kraft Arena, Skellefteå on 16 February 2013, but did not qualify for the finals.

Other careers
Razaz is also pursuing a modeling career. Many semi-nude pictures of his circulated around even before his appearances on Idol. They were taken by a modeling agency as he revealed in an interview with Swedish gay magazine QX. Because of the pictures, he enjoyed notable interest in many lifestyle and gay forums internationally. He also modeled for Tom Ford Eyewear with photography by Bingo Rimér.

Personal life
In the May 2010 issue of the Swedish gay magazine QX, Eddie Razaz came out as gay. When asked about why he didn't come out while on Idol, he answered to QX's 
Anders Öhrman: "I have always lived openly and I have stood for it all my life. And my parents have really been a fantastic support and never had any problems with it. I am fortunate to have such good parents. But when you find yourself in the spotlight, questions like  "coming out" comes up again. And I did not want to. It [coming out] should never be forced. But now I do not feel compelled, I like it here."

Discography

Singles
With Rebound!

Solo

References

External links
 Eddie Razaz Facebook
 Eddie Razaz My Space
 Eddie Razaz Twitter
 Idol 2009 page of Eddie Razaz

1988 births
Living people
English-language singers from Sweden
Swedish people of Iranian descent
Idol (Swedish TV series) participants
Swedish gay musicians
Swedish LGBT singers
Iranian LGBT people
Gay singers
21st-century Swedish male singers
20th-century LGBT people
21st-century LGBT people
Melodifestivalen contestants of 2013